Daybreak is a painting by American artist Maxfield Parrish made in 1922. Daybreak, inspired by the landscape of Vermont and New Hampshire to create lush and romantic tones, is regarded as the most popular art print of the 20th century, based on number of prints made: one for every four American homes. According to the National Museum of American Illustration, it has outsold Andy Warhol's Campbell's Soup Cans and Da Vinci's Last Supper. It is still in print. The painting is also part of the core of the neo-classical popular paintings that started to gain traction at the beginning of the 1920s. His work in his staple style was also popularized by the large scale murals he painted in the 1930s.

Parrish referred to Daybreak as his "great painting", the epitome of his work.

About Maxfield Parrish 

Originally a children's book illustrator, in line with his family's work as well, Parrish (whose name today calls to mind images of recumbent maidens, shadowed urns, multicolored crags, and blue skies) was a graduate of the Philadelphia Academy of Fine Arts.  At the age of twenty-five Parrish received early national recognition with a cover design for Harper's Weekly (1895), and for the next several decades his work was constantly before the public, thereafter he was commissioned by companies such as Jell-O and General Electric Edison Mazda Bulb. The electricity commission was where Parrish was able to express his passion for wider landscapes and the framing in all his paintings we now see as staple. He produced a series of paintings telling the history of light, the first of which appeared shortly before 1920, followed by one annually for at least eight years. These paintings were printed as magazine advertisements, calendars, window placards, and on the backs of playing card. After being so widely exposed to the public, Parrish was able to branch out, and paintings such as Daybreak began to gain popularity.

Composition 
Measuring , the painting employs a formal layout similar to a stage set, with two feminine figures. Painted using preparatory photographs, the models were his regular models, Kitty Owen (granddaughter of William Jennings Bryan), Parrish's daughter Jean, and Susan Lewin. Only two figures appear in the completed painting, though pencil studies and negative space indicate that the artist originally intended a third near the righthand column. The composition is arranged on the principle of "dynamic symmetry" popularized by Jay Hambidge.

Medium and Technique 
Referred to as "The Great Painting", this 20th century work was created by using oil paints. The technique of glazing, using a varnish over several layers of paint at once helps to achieve the soft glow and whimsical style Parrish is so well known for. Using lighting and natural models to his advantage Parrish is able to depict a serene setting for the two women, while keeping his tone of slightly out of the ordinary and neo-classic style. In looking at the other works from Parrish at the time his constant use of mild lighting and the use of contrasting cool and warm tones, it can be seen that this is how Parrish created his signature style. Like many artists Parrish also makes use of the Golden Ratio; a technique using math that helps frame the pillars and greenery to add the most focus on the two figures in this painting. While Parrish's techniques may have been tedious, almost every single fantasy illustrator you can name borrows from the technique and style of Maxfield Parrish, ensuring that his visions live on.

Record purchase price 
The painting has always been in private ownership. On May 25, 2006, Daybreak was purchased by a private collector (Mel Gibson's then-wife, Robyn) at auction at Christie's for US $7.6 million. This set a record price for a Parrish painting. It was sold again on May 21, 2010, for US$5.2 million.

In popular culture
 In 1995, Michael Jackson produced a music video, "You Are Not Alone", featuring himself and his then wife, Lisa Marie Presley, in which they appear semi-nude in emulation of Daybreak.
 The Bloom County comic book Penguin Dreams and Stranger Things features a cover with many elements of Daybreak and other works by Parrish.
 The Dalis Car album cover The Waking Hour uses a detail from Daybreak.
 The Moody Blues 1983 album The Present features cover artwork that uses a variation of Daybreak.
 A 1986 Nestle television commercial for Alpine White features one scene imitating Daybreak and another resembling Parrish's Ecstasy.
 The Saint Preux album The Last Opera also uses Daybreak for its cover.
 Daybreak in O'Bryonville (2009) is a Cincinnati mural designed for ArtWorks by contemporary artist Kate Holterhoff. Parrish's flowering vine motif figures prominently in Holterhoff's mural.
 The theatrical release poster for the 1987 film The Princess Bride is heavily inspired by Daybreak.

References

American paintings
1922 paintings